Peter Birt ( – June 1791) was a businessman from Airmyn, Yorkshire, England, who made his fortune from the Aire and Calder Navigation and used part of his wealth to build the mansion named Wenvoe Castle.
He became High Sheriff of Glamorgan.

Businessman

Peter Birt was born around 1723 in Yorkshire. 
One source says his family was well-off yeomen from Berkshire, but others said he had been "bred a tailor".
He became a merchant in the trade with Russia.
Birt became involved with Sir Henry Ibbetson in a coal-mining venture.
In 1758 Birt and Ibbetson acquired a 14-year lease on the tolls of the Aire and Calder Navigation for £6,000.
This privately-managed waterway in the West Riding of Yorkshire was one of the first river navigation schemes in Britain.
It provides a water route from the North Sea inland to the Pennine waterways by way of the Humber estuary and the River Ouse.
The partners agreed with the request of the proprietors of the Navigation to give up trading so they could not be accused of giving their goods preferential treatment.

Birt was described as unpopular but efficient.
In 1771 Birt asked John Smeaton for advice on improving the navigation to head off the threat of a proposal to build a trans-Pennine canal that would bypass the navigation.
The planned cut was extended in 1772 to almost  between the River Aire at Haddlesey and the Ouse at Selby.
In 1772 Peter Birt became the sole lessee of the Navigation, with a 21-year lease for which he paid £8,500.
This in effect gave him a monopoly of transport on the Navigation, which he exploited ruthlessly.
Birt soon owned many boats on the waterway and several important collieries in the region.

The local industrialists and woollen merchants resented Birt's control, said the Navigation was poorly maintained and demanded reform.
Birt agreed to give up his lease in return for a share of the Navigation Company.
In May 1774 Birt was given a 10% share of the Aire and Calder Navigation estates and profits by Act of Parliament.
The planned works on the Navigation were undertaken in 1775–79 and cost £40,000.
The new Selby Canal was inaugurated on 29 April 1778.
The Navigation Company was immensely profitable for the next fifty years or so, with Birt and his heirs receiving 10% of the income.
Birt decided to move away from his residence at Airmyn Hall and find a place to spend his retirement where he was less well-known.

Wenvoe castle

The owner of the estate of Wenvoe, near Cardiff, died suddenly in October 1767 leaving many debts.
The estate was put up for sale in September 1769, and was bought by Birt in September 1774 for £41,000.
The legalities were completed in May 1775.
Birt had the old castle completely demolished, although some material was reused in the new Wenvoe Castle that replaced it.
The new building was based on designs by Robert Adam dated 1776, with Birt's friend Thomas Roberts as executant architect.
Most of the new building was of locally-quarried "blue stone", but Bath stone was brought via the port of Cardiff, probably for the quoins and corner stones.
The foundations were almost complete by 29 April 1776, and the roof was on before the end of that year.

The building was massive, with a large central rectangular block from which low wings extended from each side.
The whole length was topped with battlements.
A contemporary writer said the house and grounds, "exhibits a charming effort of bad taste and bourgeoisity."

Birt was High Sheriff of Glamorgan for 1780.
He died in June 1791 and was buried at Wenvoe.
He was predeceased by his wife (1787), his son Peter (1788) and his daughter Mary, wife of John Richards of Cardiff (1790).

Legacy

Peter Birt had three surviving daughters at the time of his death, Ann, Jane and Judy.
Ann Birt married Robert Jenner (1743–1810) of Chislehurst, Kent.
Their son Robert Jenner (1776–1824) inherited Wenvoe Castle.
The castle was passed in turn to his son Robert Francis Jenner (1802–1860) and grandson Robert Francis Lascelles Jenner (1826–83).
The second son of Ann Birt and Robert Jenner was Herbert, who later took the name Herbert Jenner-Fust (1778–1852), and became an English judge.
Herbert's son, Dr. Henry Lascelles Jenner (1820–98), was the first Bishop of Dunedin.
The Bishop's son Henry Jenner (1848–1934) was an authority on the Cornish language.
Jane Birt married John Price of Llandaff.
Judy Birt married Sir John Nicholl of Merthyr Mawr on 8 September 1787.
Their marriage took place at Wenvoe.
They had one surviving son and three daughters.

The main block of Wenvoe Castle was badly damaged by fire in 1910, and later the whole building was torn down apart from a pavilion.
The estate is now a golf course.

Notes

Sources

1723 births
18th-century English businesspeople
British businesspeople in transport
History of the Vale of Glamorgan
1791 deaths
Businesspeople from Yorkshire